Johannes Ludewig (born 6 July 1945, in Hamburg) is a German manager and former secretary of state. 
He was executive director of Community of European Railway and Infrastructure Companies (CER) from 2002 until 2011.

References

1945 births
Living people
Deutsche Bahn people
Businesspeople from Hamburg
German people in rail transport
Officers Crosses of the Order of Merit of the Federal Republic of Germany